Boros unicolor is a species of conifer bark beetle in the family Boridae. It is found in North America.

References

Further reading

 

Tenebrionoidea
Articles created by Qbugbot
Beetles described in 1827